Chandrayah "Yash" Veeranah (born 23 March 1985) is a Mauritian footballer who plays as a defender for Curepipe Starlight SC in the Mauritian League and for the Mauritius national football team.

Yash Veeranah is a PE Teacher at SLT SSS. He lives in St Julien D'hotman.

References

 

Living people
1985 births
Mauritian footballers
Mauritius international footballers
Association football defenders
Mauritian Premier League players
Curepipe Starlight SC players